AK Fazlul Haque is a politician of Satkhira District and organizer of the Bangladesh Liberation war who was the Member of Parliament of Satkhira-5 constituency at that time.

Early life 
Haque was born in the Satkhira district. His son SM Ataul Haque Dolan is the general secretary of the Shyamnagar Upazila Awami League.

Career 
Haque was the organizer of the Bangladesh Liberation war and vice president of Satkhira District unit of Awami League. He was elected a Member of the Provincial Assembly in 1970 and a Member of the Constituent Assembly in 1982 as an Awami League candidate. He was elected as a Member of Parliament from the then Satkhira-5 constituency as a candidate of Awami League in the 7th Parliamentary Election of 12 June 1996. He has died.

References 

7th Jatiya Sangsad members
Awami League politicians
People of the Bangladesh Liberation War
Year of death missing
Year of birth missing
People from Satkhira District